Holiday House: A Book for the Young is a novel by Catherine Sinclair. It was first published in Edinburgh by William Whyte & Co. in 1839.

Holiday House is set in Edinburgh at some point before 1815. It tells the story of siblings Laura, Harry, and Frank Graham, who live with their uncle and grandmother. Their mother is dead and their father is out of the country.

The narrative is constructed around two sets of episodes. The first focusses on Laura and Harry's misbehaviour; the second emphasises their growing maturity. In the second portion of the narrative, Frank joins the navy, falls ill, and dies. Frank's death ends Laura and Harry's childish mischief and turns them toward a Christian ethic.

In her preface to the novel, Sinclair rejects the didacticism that had dominated children's literature in English since the late 19th century. She writes that Holiday House aims to show characters who exemplify "that species of noisy, frolicsome, mischievous children, now almost extinct". Critics have viewed Holiday House as a transitional work between this earlier period and later children's fiction by authors including Lewis Carroll, and have explored its gendered portrayal of childhood as preparation for imperial careers.

Citations

Works cited 
 
 
 
 
 
 
 
 
1839 novels
19th-century children's literature